Cantonale elections to renew canton general councillors were held in France on 10 and 17 March 1985. The left, in power since 1981, lost 10 departments. As a result, the right controlled 69 out of 95 departments.

Electoral system

The cantonales elections use the same system as the regional or legislative elections. There is a 10% threshold (10% of registered voters) needed to proceed to the second round.

National results

Runoff results missing

Sources

Alain Lancelot, Les élections sous la Ve République, PUF, Paris, 1988

1985
1985 elections in Europe